Mohammed Rabiu Al-Hassan (born 31 December 1989), simply known as Mohammed Rabiu, is a Ghanaian former professional footballer who played as a defensive midfielder. He has earned over 30 caps for the Ghana national team.

Club career

Early career 
Rabiu signed by Gimnàstic on 31 January 2008 from Liberty, at age 18, the minimum age for international transfer. He played his first game on 18 May 2008 against Sevilla Atlético, but left after 6 months and moved to Xerez CD. There, he played his first game on 11 November 2008 against CD Tenerife. On 7 August 2009. U.C. Sampdoria  signed the Ghanaian midfielder on loan from Liberty Professionals FC, the powerful half-back will be part of Sampdoria's youth team. After a season, he joined Serie A outfit Udinese Calcio, as the club borrowed the registration quota from Sampdoria.

Évian FC 
On 4 August 2010, he trained at Évian Thonon Gaillard for a possible loan, which was confirmed on late August. He made his debut at 17 October 2010, playing 10 games throughout the season On 28 June 2011, Évian achieved promotion to Ligue 1 in the 2010–11 season, and completed a five-year permanent deal for Rabiu, for a €1M fee.

Kuban Krasnodar 
On 22 August 2013, Rabiu signed a three-year deal with Kuban Krasnodar, for a reported €2.6M fee.

FC Anzhi Makhachkala 
On 16 August 2016, he signed a 3.5-year contract with FC Anzhi Makhachkala. He didn't play any games for Anzhi in the first half of the 2016–17 season as he was recovering from injury. On 30 December 2016, Anzhi removed him from their Russian Premier League roster. On 6 February 2017, another Russian club FC Dynamo Moscow confirmed that they are considering inviting Rabiu for a tryout. On 9 February 2017, his agent said Rabiu is still recovering from injury and will not go on Dynamo tryout, and he still might return to Anzhi for the rest of the 2016–17 season. The registration deadline for the 2016–17 season passed on 24 February 2017 without Rabiu getting re-registered for Anzhi.

On 23 July 2018, FC Anzhi Makhachkala announced that they had re-signed Rabiu after his recovery from injury.

After Anzhi Makhachkala 
On 23 February 2019, Krylia Sovetov announced the signing of Rabiu. On 7 July 2019, Krylia Sovetov announced that Rabiu left the team due to health problems.

On 21 August 2019, he returned to France, signing a one-season contract with Paris FC.

On 9 October 2020, he signed with Russian Premier League club FC Tambov.

International career
Rabiu represented the Black Satellites on international level, he played with the team in the qualifications for the 2009 African Youth Championship in Rwanda. In 2008, he was called up to the Black Stars squad for the 2008 African Cup of Nations in Ghana.

International appearances
Source:

Titles and honours

Club
Évian
 Ligue 2: 2010–11

International
Ghana U-20
 FIFA U-20 World Cup: 2009

References

External links
 

1989 births
Living people
Ghanaian footballers
Ghanaian expatriate footballers
Ghana under-20 international footballers
Ghana international footballers
Liberty Professionals F.C. players
Gimnàstic de Tarragona footballers
Xerez CD footballers
U.C. Sampdoria players
Udinese Calcio players
Thonon Evian Grand Genève F.C. players
Ligue 2 players
Ligue 1 players
Expatriate footballers in Spain
Ghanaian expatriate sportspeople in Italy
Expatriate footballers in Italy
Ghanaian expatriate sportspeople in Spain
Expatriate footballers in France
Association football midfielders
2013 Africa Cup of Nations players
2014 FIFA World Cup players
2015 Africa Cup of Nations players
Expatriate footballers in Russia
Russian Premier League players
FC Kuban Krasnodar players
FC Anzhi Makhachkala players
PFC Krylia Sovetov Samara players
Paris FC players
FC Tambov players
Konongo Odumase Senior High School alumni